Ismah Khatun was a Seljuk princess, daughter of sultan Malik Shah (r. 1072–1092) and principal wife of Abbasid caliph al-Mustazhir (r. 1094–1118).

Background
Ismah Khatun was one of the youngest daughter of Seljuk sultan Malik Shah. She was very young when her father died in 1092, he was succeeded by his underage son Mahmud I under the regency of Terken Khatun. She was the regent during his minority in 1092–1094.

Later her other brothers; Berkyaruq, Malik-Shah II and Muhammad Tapar also became Sultans.

Biography
She was one of Al-Mustazhir's wives. She was the daughter of Seljuk Sultan Malik-Shah I. Al-Mustazhir married her in Isfahan in 1109. She later came to Baghdad and took up residence in the Caliphal palace. On 3 February 1112, she gave birth to prince Abu Ishaq Ibrahim, who died of smallpox in October 1114, and was buried in the mausoleum of al-Muqtadir in Rusafah Cemetery, beside his uncle Ja'far, son of the caliph al-Muqtadi. Upon the death of Al-Mustazhir, Ismah returned to Isfahan, where she died, and was buried within the law college that she had founded there on Barracks Market Street.

Her husband died in 1118. In the same year her half-brother sultan Muhammad Tapar also died.

After the death of her husband, he was succeeded by al-Mustarshid. He was Al-Mustazhir's son from a concubine Lubanah. She was from Baghdad.

See also
 Gawhar Khatun

References

Sources
 
 al-Sāʿī, Ibn; Toorawa, Shawkat M.; Bray, Julia (2017). Women and the Court of Baghdad. Library of Arabic Literature. NYU Press. pp. 62, 65

Seljuk dynasty
11th-century Turkic people
12th-century Turkic people
Turkic female royalty
Wives of Abbasid caliphs